Pelagocephalus is a genus of pufferfish which is from the coasts of South Africa and New Zealand. It is monotypic, being represented by the single species, Pelagocephalus marki, also known as the rippled blaasop. This species grows to a length of about  TL.

References
 

Tetraodontidae
Monotypic fish genera
Fish described in 1981